1979 in sports describes the year's events in world sport.

Alpine skiing
 Alpine Skiing World Cup
 Men's overall season champion: Peter Lüscher, Switzerland
 Women's overall season champion: Annemarie Moser-Pröll, Austria

American football
 Super Bowl XIII – the Pittsburgh Steelers (AFC) won 35−31 over the Dallas Cowboys (NFC)
 Location: Miami Orange Bowl
 Attendance: 79,484
 MVP: Terry Bradshaw, QB (Pittsburgh)
 Sugar Bowl (1978 season):
 The Alabama Crimson Tide won 14–7 over the Penn State Nittany Lions to claim AP Poll national championship
 August 4 – Opening game of the American Football Bundesliga played between Frankfurter Löwen and Düsseldorf Panther, first-ever league game of American football in Germany.
 November 10 – German Bowl I – Frankfurter Löwen defeated the Ansbach Grizzlies 14–8.

Artistic gymnastics
 World Artistic Gymnastics Championships –
 Men's all-around champion: Alexander Dityatin, USSR
 Women's all-around champion: Nellie Kim, USSR
 Men's team competition champion: USSR
 Women's team competition champion: Romania

Association football
 May 12 – England – FA Cup – Arsenal win 3–2 over Manchester United
 Sport Club Internacional win the Brazilian Championship undefeated

Australian rules football
 Victorian Football League
 April 28: Collingwood beats a 70-year-old record for the greatest winning margin in VFL football when they beat St. Kilda by 178 points 31.21 (207) to 3.11 (29)
 July 28: Fitzroy beats Collingwood's three-month-old record when they beat Melbourne 36.22 (238) to 6.12 (48) with Bob Beecroft kicking ten goals
 Carlton win the 83rd VFL Premiership (Carlton 11.16 (82) d Collingwood 11.11 (77))
 Brownlow Medal awarded to Peter Moore (Collingwood)

Baseball
 January 23 – Willie Mays receives 409 of 432 votes in the BBWAA election to earn enshrinement in the Hall of Fame.
 July 12 – Disco Demolition Night at Comiskey Park between the Chicago White Sox and Detroit Tigers
 August 2 – death of Thurman Munson, New York Yankees catcher, in an air crash
 World Series – Pittsburgh Pirates won 4 games to 3 over the Baltimore Orioles. The Series MVP was Willie Stargell, Pittsburgh.  The Pirates become the only team in sports history to come back from a three games to one deficit in a championship series twice, having also achieved the comeback in the 1925 World Series.

Basketball
 NCAA Division I Men's Basketball Championship –
 Michigan St. wins 75–64 over Indiana St.
 NBA Finals –
 Seattle SuperSonics, coached by Lenny Wilkens, won 4 games to 1 over the Washington Bullets for the only finals win in Seattle SuperSonics history.
 National Basketball League (Australia) –
 The Australian NBL was founded. The St Kilda Saints became the first champions by defeating the Canberra Cannons 94–93 in the final.

Boxing
 September 28 in Las Vegas, Larry Holmes retains his World Heavyweight title with an 11th-round TKO of Earnie Shavers.
 November 30 in Las Vegas, dual world championship undercard: Vito Antuofermo retains his world Middleweight title with a 15-round draw (tie) against Marvin Hagler, and Sugar Ray Leonard wins his first world title, beating WBC world Welterweight champion Wilfred Benítez by knockout in round 15.

Canadian football
 Grey Cup – Edmonton Eskimos win 17–9 over the Montreal Alouettes
 Vanier Cup – Acadia Axemen win 34–12 over the Western Ontario Mustangs

Cricket
 Cricket World Cup – West Indies beat England by 92 runs
 World Series Cricket rival competition to official International Cricket Council matches is disbanded.

Cycling
 Giro d'Italia – won by Giuseppe Saronni of Italy
 Tour de France – Bernard Hinault of France
 UCI Road World Championships – Men's road race – Jan Raas of Netherlands

Dogsled racing
 Iditarod Trail Sled Dog Race Champion –
 Rick Swenson won with lead dogs: Andy & O.B. (Old Buddy)

Field hockey
 1979 Pan American Games men's competition held in San Juan, Puerto Rico and won by Argentina
 August – The 2nd Women's World Field Hockey Championships are held at Vancouver, British Columbia, Canada with the Netherlands as the champions.

Figure skating
 World Figure Skating Championships –
 Men's champion: Vladimir Kovalev, Soviet Union
 Ladies' champion: Linda Fratianne, United States
 Pair skating champions: Tai Babilonia & Randy Gardner, United States
 Ice dancing champions: Natalia Linichuk & Gennadi Karponossov, Soviet Union

Golf
Men's professional
 Masters Tournament – Fuzzy Zoeller defeats Ed Sneed and Tom Watson in the second hole of a sudden-death playoff, the first time the Masters used a sudden-death format.
 U.S. Open – Hale Irwin
 British Open – Seve Ballesteros becomes the first golfer from Continental Europe to win a major since Arnaud Massy of France won this event in 1907.
 PGA Championship – David Graham
 PGA Tour money leader – Tom Watson – $462,636
 Ryder Cup – United States won 17–11 over Europe in the first Ryder Cup to feature a side representing all of Europe.
Men's amateur
 British Amateur – Jay Sigel
 U.S. Amateur – Mark O'Meara
Women's professional
 LPGA Championship – Donna Caponi
 U.S. Women's Open – Jerilyn Britz
 Classique Peter Jackson Classic – Amy Alcott
 LPGA Tour money leader – Nancy Lopez – $197,489

Harness racing
 The Hambletonian is awarded to Meadowlands Racetrack, starting in 1981.
 United States Pacing Triple Crown races –
 Cane Pace – Happy Motoring
 Little Brown Jug – Hot Hitter
 Messenger Stakes – Hot Hitter
 United States Trotting Triple Crown races –
 Hambletonian – Legend Hanover
 Yonkers Trot – Mo Bandy
 Kentucky Futurity – Filet of Sole
 Australian Inter Dominion Harness Racing Championship –
 Pacers: Rondel
 Trotters: No Response

Horse racing
Steeplechases
 Cheltenham Gold Cup – Alverton
 Grand National – Rubstic
Flat races
 Australia – Melbourne Cup won by Hyperno
 Canada – Queen's Plate won by Steady Growth
 France – Prix de l'Arc de Triomphe won by Three Troikas
 Ireland – Irish Derby Stakes won by Troy
 English Triple Crown Races:
 2,000 Guineas Stakes – Tap On Wood
 The Derby – Troy
 St. Leger Stakes – Son of Love
 United States Triple Crown Races:
 Kentucky Derby – Spectacular Bid
 Preakness Stakes – Spectacular Bid
 Belmont Stakes – Coastal

Ice hockey
 Art Ross Trophy as the NHL's leading scorer during the regular season: Bryan Trottier, New York Islanders
 Hart Memorial Trophy for the NHL's Most Valuable Player: Bryan Trottier, New York Islanders
 Stanley Cup – Montreal Canadiens win 4 games to 1 over the New York Rangers
 World Hockey Championship
 Men's champion: Soviet Union defeated Czechoslovakia
 Junior Men's champion: Soviet Union defeated Sweden
 Réal Cloutier of the Quebec Nordiques became the second NHL player to score a hat trick in his debut NHL game.
 Avco World Trophy – Winnipeg Jets won 4 games to 2 over the Edmonton Oilers

Motorsport

Rugby league
1979 Amco Cup
1979 European Rugby League Championship
1979 New Zealand rugby league season
1978–79 Northern Rugby Football League season / 1979–80 Northern Rugby Football League season
1979 NSWRFL season

Rugby union
 85th Five Nations Championship series is won by Wales

Snooker
 World Snooker Championship – outsider Terry Griffiths beats Dennis Taylor 24-16
 World rankings – Ray Reardon remains world number one for 1979/80

Swimming
 Pan American Games in San Juan, Puerto Rico
 July 23 – West Germany's Klaus Steinbach sets a world record in the 50m freestyle at a swimming meet in Freiburg, shaving off 0.02 of the previous record (23.72) set by Ron Manganiello nearly a year ago: 23.70.

Tennis
 Grand Slam in tennis men's results:
 Australian Open – Guillermo Vilas
 French Open – Björn Borg
 Wimbledon championships – July 7 – Björn Borg
 U.S. Open – John McEnroe
 Grand Slam in tennis women's results:
 Australian Open – Barbara Jordan
 French Open – Chris Evert
 Wimbledon championships – July 7 – Martina Navratilova
 U.S. Open – Tracy Austin, youngest US Open Champion at the age of 16 years, 8 months and 28 days defeating 4-time defending champion Chris Evert 6–4, 6–3 in the final after defeating 2nd seeded Martina Navratilova in the semifinal making Evert lose for the first time in 32 matches.
 Davis Cup – United States wins 5–0 over Italy in world tennis.

Volleyball
 Asian Men's Volleyball Championship: won by China
 Asian Women's Volleyball Championship: won by China
 Men and Women's European Volleyball Championship held in France: both won by USSR
 Volleyball at the 1979 Pan American Games in San Juan, Puerto Rico: men's and women's tournaments both won by Cuba

Water polo
 1979 FINA Men's Water Polo World Cup held in Yugoslavia and won by Hungary
 1979 FINA Women's Water Polo World Cup held in Merced, California and won by USA

Multi-sport events
 8th Pan American Games held in San Juan, Puerto Rico
 8th Mediterranean Games held in Split, Yugoslavia
 Tenth Summer Universiade held in Mexico City, Mexico
 September 7 – The Entertainment and Sports Programming Network (ESPN) makes its debut.

Awards
 Associated Press Male Athlete of the Year – Willie Stargell, Major League Baseball
 Associated Press Female Athlete of the Year – Tracy Austin, Tennis
 ABC's Wide World of Sports Athlete of the Year: Willie Stargell, Major League Baseball

References

 
Sports by year